José Luis Báez is a Puerto Rican politician born in Mayagüez, PR and resident of San Juan, PR affiliated with the Popular Democratic Party (PPD). He was elected to the Puerto Rico House of Representatives on 2012 to represent District 4. Jose Luis Báez is the son of former senator Eudaldo Báez Galib.

In December 2015, Báez announced that he would not run for an elective position in the 2016 general elections. He attributed his retirement from active politics to the discontent with how the members of his party, the Popular Democratic Party (PPD), were handling differences between them.

References

External links
José Luis Báez Profile on WAPA-TV

Living people
Popular Democratic Party members of the House of Representatives of Puerto Rico
People from Mayagüez, Puerto Rico
Year of birth missing (living people)